The elections in India in 2017 include the seven state legislative assembly elections.

Maps

State legislatures

Presidential election 

A presidential election was held in India on 17 July 2017 before the term of the President Pranab Mukherjee ended. Ram Nath Kovind was declared the winner after the counting of votes which was held on 20 July 2017.

Vice Presidential election 

A  Vice Presidential election were held in India on 5 August 2017 before the term of Vice President Mohammad Hamid Ansari ends. Venkaiah Naidu was elected as the Vice President of India. Mr Naidu received 516 votes defeating the opposition's candidate, Gopal Krishna Gandhi, who got 244 votes. A total of 771 out of 785 parliamentarians voted in the election. M Venkaiah Naidu's victory margin of 272 votes is the highest in a vice presidential election in the last three decades.

Parliamentary By-election

Legislative assembly elections

Punjab 

Elections for the State assembly were held on 4 February 2017 with 75 per cent voter turnout. In Punjab all the 117 assembly constituencies have triangular contests between major parties makes the results uncertain.

Result was declared on 11 March 2017.

Goa 

Elections for the State assembly were held on 4 February 2017 with 83 per cent turnout. The BJP, MGP, GFP and two independents formed an alliance to win the election.

Uttar Pradesh 

Assembly elections in Uttar Pradesh were held between 11 February and 9 March 2017 in seven phases. Result was declared on 11 March 2017.

Uttarakhand 

Elections for the State assembly were held on 15 February 2017 with a 65.64 per cent turnout. Result was declared on 11 March 2017.

Manipur 

Assembly elections in Manipur were held on 4 March and 8 March 2017 in two phases. The result was declared on 11 March 2017.

Himachal Pradesh 

Elections for the State assembly was held on 9 November 2017. Voting turnout recorded 74%, which is highest ever in the state.
The results were declared on 18 December 2017. Over 0.9% of all voters in the election specified the 'None of the Above' option, which amounted to than 33,000 votes.

Gujarat 

Elections for the State Assembly were held on 9 and 14 December 2017. The result was declared on 18 December 2017.

Legislative Assembly by-elections

Andhra Pradesh

Arunachal Pradesh

Assam

Delhi

Goa

Himachal Pradesh

Jharkhand

Karnataka

Kerala

Madhya Pradesh

Nagaland

Rajasthan

Sikkim

Tamil Nadu

Uttar Pradesh

West Bengal

See also
2016 elections in India
2018 elections in India

References

External links 

Election Commission of India
 Raajneeti – Election 2017 Updates

 
Elections in India by year